A proctodeum is the back ectodermal part of an alimentary canal. It is created during embryogenesis by a folding of the outer body wall. It will form the lower part of the anal canal, below the pectinate line, which will be lined by stratified squamous non-keratinized (zona hemorrhagica) and stratified squamous keratinized (zona cutanea) epithelium. The junction between them is Hilton's white line.

External links
 

Embryology of digestive system